Zuccarello is a comune (municipality) in the Province of Savona in the Italian region Liguria, located about  southwest of Genoa and about  southwest of Savona.

Zuccarello borders the following municipalities: Arnasco, Balestrino, Castelbianco, Castelvecchio di Rocca Barbena, Cisano sul Neva, and Erli. Sights include the church of San Bartolomeo, built in the 13th century, the Marquisses' Palace, the remains of a castle, and the chapel of Sant'Antonio Abate, with late medieval frescoes.

References

External links
 Official website

Cities and towns in Liguria